Events from the year 1788 in Austria

Incumbents
 Monarch – Joseph II

Events

 Austro-Turkish War begins
 Battle of Karansebes

 
 Theater in der Josefstadt

Births

Deaths

References

 
Years of the 18th century in Austria